Serkan Ciftci (born 3 August 1989) is an Austrian footballer who plays as a forward for ATSV Hollabrunn.

External links
 
 

1989 births
Living people
Austrian people of Turkish descent
Austrian footballers
Association football forwards
Austrian Football Bundesliga players
Liga I players
First Vienna FC players
SK Rapid Wien players
Giresunspor footballers
ASC Oțelul Galați players
SC Wiener Neustadt players
SK Sturm Graz players
Dardanelspor footballers
Austrian expatriate footballers
Austrian expatriate sportspeople in Romania
Expatriate footballers in Romania